Bernard Cazeau (born 27 April 1939 in Bordeaux) is a member of the Senate of France, representing the Dordogne department.  He was a member of the Socialist Party, and moved to LREM in 2017.

In addition to his role in the Senate, Cazeau has been serving as member of the Dutch delegation to the Parliamentary Assembly of the Council of Europe since 2017. As member of the Alliance of Liberals and Democrats for Europe, he is currently a member of the Committee on Social Affairs, Health and Sustainable Development and the Sub-Committee on Public Health and Sustainable Development.

References

Page on the Senate website

1939 births
Living people
Politicians from Bordeaux
Socialist Party (France) politicians
French Senators of the Fifth Republic
La République En Marche! politicians
Senators of Dordogne
Mayors of places in Nouvelle-Aquitaine
French physicians